The pyranoflavonoids are a type of flavonoids possessing a pyran group.

Cyclocommunin is another natural pyranoflavonoid.

Pyranoanthocyanins

Pyranoisoflavones 
 Alpinumisoflavone
 Di-O-methylalpinumisoflavone
 4'-methyl-alpinumisoflavone
 5,3′,4′-trihydroxy-2″,2″-dimethylpyrano (5″,6″:7,8) isoflavone - has antifungal properties, and is from the plant species ficus tikoua Bur.
The enzyme monoprenyl isoflavone epoxidase produces a dihydrofurano pyranoisoflavone derivative from 7-O-methylluteone.

Pyranoflavonols
Karanjachromene

References

Flavonoids